Simon Francis Gray (born 29 April 1959) is a retired British international swimmer.

Swimming career
Gray competed in three events at the 1980 Summer Olympics. In 1978 he won four medals at the Commonwealth Games, representing England he won a bronze medal in the 4x200m freestyle relay and three silver medals in the 400 and 1,500 metres freestyle and the 440 metres individual medley, at the 1978 Commonwealth Games in Edmonton, Alberta, Canada. In 1978 he won the ASA National British Championships 200 metres medley title and the 1978 and 1980 ASA National Championship 400 metres medley title. He also the 1978 ASA British National 1500 metres freestyle title.

References

External links
 

1959 births
Living people
British male swimmers
Olympic swimmers of Great Britain
Swimmers at the 1980 Summer Olympics
People from Fulham
Sportspeople from London
Commonwealth Games medallists in swimming
Commonwealth Games silver medallists for England
Commonwealth Games bronze medallists for England
Swimmers at the 1978 Commonwealth Games
Medallists at the 1978 Commonwealth Games